Leben is the third studio album by German electronic musician, composer and producer Christopher von Deylen under his Schiller alias. It features collaborations with renowned vocalists such as Sarah Brightman, Maya Saban, Peter Heppner and Kim Sanders.
Schiller used Daf and Tombak which are the two most Powerful Persian percussive instruments on the 10th track of this album (The Smile ft Sarah Brightman)

The album achieved platinum status in Germany in 2016.

Track listing

References

External links 
 Leben at Discogs

2003 albums
Trance albums
Schiller (band) albums